Walsh is a hamlet in Alberta, Canada within Cypress County.

The hamlet is located in Census Division No. 1 and in the federal riding of Medicine Hat.

Walsh is likely named for the prominent North-West Mounted Police officer, James Walsh, who established a fort there in the early days of that organization.

Demographics 

See also 
List of communities in Alberta
List of designated places in Alberta
List of former urban municipalities in Alberta
List of hamlets in Alberta

References 

Cypress County
Hamlets in Alberta
Designated places in Alberta
Former villages in Alberta